Dual-pivot steering geometry (also known as virtual pivot) is a geometric arrangement of linkages in the steering of a car designed to reduce or eliminate scrub radius by moving the pivot point of the king pin outboard, in order to improve steering precision and straight line stability.

It is typically used with a MacPherson strut, but can also be applied to a double wishbone suspension. In either case, the difference is that the single bottom wishbone is replaced by a pair of suspension links forming a trapezoidal four-bar linkage. This allows the kingpin to pivot about a pivot point nearer the center of the wheel's contact patch instead of the traditional pivot point at the ball joint of the bottom wishbone.

Examples 
 Hyundai Genesis Coupe
 BMW 750i
 BMW 3 Series
 Pontiac G8
 Ford Territory
 Ford Falcon
 Tesla Model S

See also
 Scrub radius
 MacPherson strut
 Double wishbone suspension
 King pin
 Steering
 Four-bar linkage
 Ackermann steering geometry
 Control arm
 Radius rod

References

External links 
 Car-engineer.com: MacPherson and Pseudo-MacPherson Suspension

Automotive steering technologies